The men's high jump event  at the 1979 European Athletics Indoor Championships was held on 24 February in Vienna.

Results

References

High jump at the European Athletics Indoor Championships
High